Hockley Row – also known as Evans Row or Victoria House – is a set of four architecturally significant rowhouses, which are located in the Rittenhouse Square West neighborhood of Philadelphia, Pennsylvania.

The houses were added to the National Register of Historic Places in 1983.

History and architectural features
Design of the row – 237, 239 & 241 South 21st Street and 2049 Locust Street – is attributed to architect Allen Evans, who was a partner in the firm of Furness & Evans. They were built as speculative housing by Evans's father, between 1884 and 1886. The architect then made number 237 (SE corner 21st & St. James Streets) his own residence.

Each features a rusticated stone basement level, with three brick stories above, bay or box windows, wrought iron railings, elaborately shaped chimneys, and shed- and gabled-roofed dormers. 

The house at number 237 features a projecting, two-story, shingled corner tower; the houses at numbers 239 and 241 share an entrance stair. The house at the northeast corner of 21st & Locust Streets has its entrance from the south, and is numbered 2049 Locust Street.

The houses were added to the National Register of Historic Places in 1983.

Hockley House

Directly north of this row, at 235 S. 21st Street, is the Thomas Hockley House (1875), designed by architect Frank Furness. Allen Evans was a draftsman in Furness's office when it was built.

References

Houses on the National Register of Historic Places in Philadelphia
Houses completed in 1886
Houses in Philadelphia
Rittenhouse Square, Philadelphia